, also known as Katsuya Terada's The Monkey King, is a fantasy manga series, written and illustrated in full color by Katsuya Terada.

Story 
The story is based on the 16th century Chinese novel Journey to the West. Katsuya Terada's take on the legend of the Monkey King in a savage, lusty saga that The Portland Tribune calls "a Buddhist version of Conan the Barbarian.":

References

External links
 The Monkey Kings Manga site (Dark Horse Comics)
 

1998 manga
Adventure anime and manga
Chinese mythology in anime and manga
Dark Horse Comics titles
Fantasy anime and manga
Seinen manga
Shenmo fiction
Shueisha manga
Works based on Journey to the West